Nurulislam Hadzhyyevych Arkallayev is the People's Deputy of Ukraine, a member of the Party of Regions.

Nurulislam Arkallayev was born on January 19, 1961, in Kumukh village, Laksky district, Dagestan, Russia.

Family
Spouse Arkallayeva Umamat Alilivna (1972), sons Arslan (1991), Murat (1993), Ramzan (2001).

Education
Nurulislam Arkallayev graduated from Donetsk State University in 1988, majoring in "Accounting and business analysis".

Career

 1999-2004 - Deputy Director for foreign economic policy in the joint venture "UkrRos Invest."
 2004-2005 - Deputy Director for foreign monetary policy of LLC "Aquilon."
 2005-2006 - Chairman of the Supervisory Board, LLC "Aquilon."

Politics
May 2006 - November 2007 - People's Deputy in the 5th Verkhovna Rada from Party of Regions, No. 72 in the list

Since July 2006 has been a Member of the Committee for Family, Youth Policies, Sport, and Tourism.

Re-elected in the 2012 elections for the Party of Regions.

He did not participate in the 2014 elections.

Sport

President of Donetsk Region Judo Federation (since 2003), USSR Master of sports in judo.

See also 
 List of Ukrainian Parliament Members 2007
 Verkhovna Rada

References

External links 
  Nurulislam Arkallayev at Verkhovna Rada of Ukraine official web-site

1961 births
Living people
People from Laksky District
Laks (Caucasus)
Ukrainian people of Dagestani descent
Party of Regions politicians
Fifth convocation members of the Verkhovna Rada
Sixth convocation members of the Verkhovna Rada
Seventh convocation members of the Verkhovna Rada
Ukrainian businesspeople
Donetsk National University alumni
Ukrainian male judoka